Opal Tapes is an English independent record label that releases abstracted forms of house music, techno, and other types of electronic music. Founded by Stephen Bishop (who produces original music as "Basic House") in 2012 in the small town of Redcar in northeastern England, Opal Tapes is now based in Newcastle, UK. Opal Tapes is well known for releasing its music on cassettes in addition to more popular formats such as vinyl. In January 2013, electronic music magazine Resident Advisor named Opal Tapes its "Label of the Month."

Opal Tapes Discography

Black Opal Discography

BOPW catalogue discontinued. All titles are now BOP whether single/EP/LP

References

English record labels
Techno record labels
House music record labels